Vazov is a Bulgarian surname. It can refer to:

 Ivan Vazov, a Bulgarian poet, novelist and playwright
 Vladimir Vazov, a Bulgarian Lieutenant General
 Vazov Rock, a rocky peak in the South Shetland Islands
 Vazov Point, a point on the coast of Bransfield Strait, South Shetland Islands
 Ivan Vazov National Theatre, Bulgaria's national theater
 Ivan Vazov National Library, a library situated in the Bulgarian city of Plovdiv